Panthera tigris acutidens or Wanhsien tiger is an extinct tiger subspecies, which was scientifically described in 1928 based on fossils excavated near Wanhsien in southern China's Sichuan Province. Otto Zdansky named it Felis acutidens. After the fossils were re-examined in 1947, they were attributed to Panthera tigris acutidens by Dirk Albert Hooijer and Walter W. Granger.

Description
The P. t. acutidens fossils from Wanhsien in the collection of the American Museum of Natural History consist of two skulls, a humerus, two metacarpals, a tibia, an astragalus, two calcanea, and five metatarsals, and several parts of jaws.

See also
 Bornean tiger
 Panthera tigris soloensis
 Panthera tigris trinilensis
 Panthera zdanskyi

References

tigris acutidens
tigris acutidens
Pleistocene carnivorans
Prehistoric mammals of Asia